Jaswant Deed (born 11 March 1954 in Shahkot, Jalandhar Punjab) is a Punjabi poet .

Books

Published Work:

Poetry;

1.Bache Ton Dardi Kavita – (1985-2003)
2.Achanchet – (1990-2003)
3.Awaaz Ayegi Aje – (1996-2003)
4.Ghundi – (2001-2003)
5.Kamandal - (2004-2009)
6.Aawagvn – (2012)
7. Tera Rang Nachave(select poems)-(2014)

Prose;

1.Dharti Hor Pre – (2010)
2.Khaddi- (2017)

Short story;

1.Ik Lapp Yadan Di – (1970)

Edited;
1.Desh Vand Dian Kahanian – (1985)
(short stories of partition of India and Pakistan) 

Translations;

1.	Jungle Di Kahani - From English to Punjabi -(1980) 
2.	Yashpal – From Hindi to Punjabi – (1985)
3.	Guru Ladho Re - From Hindi to Punjabi -(1988)
4.	Ruko Prithvi- selected poems of Pablo Neruda – From Hindi to Punjabi. -2015
5.	Kamladas- (Poems of Kamla Das from English to Panjabi)

Awards For Literature

•	National Sahit Academy Award, poetry book ‘Kamandal’ – 2007
•	Best Punjabi poet of the state (Poet Laureate) Awarded by Punjab Language Department - 2010
•	Best Panjabi prose book (Dharti Hor Pre), Language department Punjab – 2008
•	Prof. Mohan Singh Award, GNDU Amritsar (Poetry: ‘Bache Ton Dardi Kavita’) – 1985

Professional Qualifications in Digital Media

•	Trained from Film and television institute of India, (FTII Pune) in film and TV productions.
•	Thirty-two years’ experience in Television & Radio Productions. (Digital and Analogue)

Experience in TV/Film Productions

•	Produced approximately 50 TV documentaries/Films on life and works of eminent writers/painters and other well-known personalities. 
•	Produced numerous special musicals & cultural heritage programs.
•	Produced TV shows and dramas.
•	Produced special series of documentaries, features on the history of Siri Guru Granth Sahib and its message of universal brotherhood, peace, and communal harmony.
•	Ex-Director, Television Center, Doordarshan Kendra (Govt. of India TV channel) Shimla.

Social Media sites Digital Productions:

•	 Produced in Canada, a documentary on Ghadar Movement: Hind Vasio Rakhna Yaad Sanu (2013)
•	Directed a short film of 45 minutes duration titled ‘Jalpari’ Canada, 2018.

Awards

He won the Sahitya Akademi Award in 2007 for his book Kamandal (Poetry).

References 

1954 births
Living people
Poets from Punjab, India
Punjabi-language writers
Recipients of the Sahitya Akademi Award in Punjabi
20th-century Indian poets
People from Jalandhar district